Christine Elizabeth Fletcher  (née Lees, born 25 January 1955) is a New Zealand politician. Currently an Auckland Council councillor, she was previously a National Party Member of Parliament from 1990 to 1999, and served one term as Mayor of Auckland City between 1998 and 2001. In October 2010 she became the co-leader of the Auckland local body ticket Citizens & Ratepayers after winning the Albert-Eden-Roskill ward on the new Auckland Council.

Early life and family
Fletcher was born in 1955, the daughter of Shirley and Ted Lees, the founder of heavy machinery and marine engine company Lees Industries. Educated at St Cuthbert's College, Auckland, she was married to Angus Fletcher, and was thus the sister-in-law of former Fletcher Challenge CEO Hugh Fletcher and his wife Chief Justice Sian Elias.

Political career

Member of Parliament

At the 1990 general election, Fletcher was the National Party candidate for the Eden electorate, and defeated the Labour incumbent, Richard Northey. She then held the seat at the 1993 election. After Labour MP Peter Dunne became an independent MP in October 1994 Fletcher approached him to join the National Party. Dunne declined the offer however.

She won the new Epsom electorate in the 1996 election, and was subsequently appointed to the ministerial roles of Local Government, Women's Affairs and Cultural Affairs. However, she resigned as a minister on 11 September 1997, because she objected to the sale of the assets of the Auckland Regional Services Trust proposed by National.

Mayor of Auckland City
Fletcher retired as an MP in 1999, having been elected Mayor of Auckland City at the 1998 local-body elections. She was the second woman to hold the office, after Cath Tizard. Fletcher's mayoralty was characterised by the decision to progress with the Britomart Transport Centre in downtown Auckland. In 2001 she was defeated by John Banks, another former National MP. She continued her opposition to Banks in the following years, particularly opposing the Eastern Transport Corridor, which Banks had proposed as a major motorway, and which she noted she had been opposing for more than a decade by then.

In the 2002 New Year Honours, Fletcher was appointed a Companion of the Queen's Service Order for public services.

She ran again for the mayoralty in October 2004, but finished third behind Dick Hubbard and Banks.

Life after mayoralty and return to politics

After her mayoral term, Fletcher became involved in various community organisations, including the Motutapu Trust, a conservation body involved in protecting Motutapu Island in the Hauraki Gulf.

She was a contributor in 2004 to a book by the Better Democracy group, promoting citizen participation in the New Zealand democratic process.

In 2010 she announced her candidacy for the Albert-Eden-Roskill ward on the new Auckland council, where she eventually succeeded in polling highest for one of the two available councillor seats in her ward. She considered that working for a CBD rail tunnel was one of her main priorities, extending the capacity of Britomart, whose construction she had successfully fought for in her mayoral term.

Fletcher was re-elected in 2013, 2016, 2019 and 2022.

References

|-

|-

1955 births
Living people
People educated at St Cuthbert's College, Auckland
Members of the New Zealand House of Representatives
New Zealand MPs for Auckland electorates
New Zealand National Party MPs
Mayors of Auckland
Women mayors of places in New Zealand
Women members of the New Zealand House of Representatives
Auckland Councillors
Companions of the Queen's Service Order
Christine
21st-century New Zealand politicians
21st-century New Zealand women politicians